Inoke is a masculine given name. Notable people with the name include:

Inoke Afeaki (born 1973), Tongan rugby union player
Inoke Breckterfield (born 1977), American football player and coach
Inoke Kubuabola (born 1948), Fijian politician
Inoke Takiveikata (born 1947), Fijian chief and politician

See also
Inoke language, a Papuan language

Masculine given names